Green Acres is an American comedy television series which aired from 1965 to 1971. With a reunion movie from 1990. 

Green Acres or Greenacres may also refer to:

Places

United States
Green Acres, California, a census-designated place
Green Acres, Visalia, California, a neighborhood
Green Acres, Delaware, an unincorporated community
Green Acres, Indiana, an unincorporated community
Green Acres, North Dakota, a census-designated place
Green Acres, Coos County, Oregon, an unincorporated community
Green Acres, Virginia, an unincorporated community

Canada
Green Acres, Nova Scotia, Canada, a residential neighbourhood in Halifax
Green Acres, a locality in Leduc County, Alberta
Green Acres, a community in the municipality of Trent Hills, Ontario

Other
Green Acres Baptist Church, Tyler, Texas
Green Acres Mall, in Valley Stream, New York
Harold Lloyd Estate in Beverly Hills, California, a mansion also known as Greenacres

See also
Green Acre Baháʼí School, a conference facility in Eliot, Maine
Greenacres (disambiguation)